BBC Prime was the BBC's general entertainment TV channel in Europe, Middle East, Africa, South Asia and Asia Pacific from 30 January 1995 until 11 November 2009, when it was replaced by BBC Entertainment.

Launch

BBC Prime was launched at 19:00 GMT on Thursday, 26 January 1995 when the former BBC World Service Television was split into two separate television stations:
BBC World: a 24-hour English free-to-air terrestrial international news channel airing news bulletins, information, business and financial, news magazine and current affairs programmes. Now known as BBC World News.
 BBC Prime: a 24-hour English subscription lifestyle, variety and entertainment channel airing variety, culture, leisure, lifestyle, art and light entertainment programmes. Now known as BBC Entertainment.

Programming
The channel broadcast drama, comedy and lifestyle programmes which it repeated on a monthly basis. Every day since the channel's 2000 rebrand, it allocated six hours per day to educational programmes from BBC Learning (shown in the European small hours, between 01:00 and 07:00 CET); this practice was abandoned on 23 July 2006 "with the intention of improving the relevance and appeal of the channel to the widest audience". It also included a special children's strand, using the CBBC brand and idents, by the name of CBBC on BBC Prime, or CBBC Prime.

When it first launched, BBC Prime also carried programming from the former ITV company Thames Television, since BBC Worldwide had a joint venture with Thames's parent company, Pearson and Cox Communications, known as European Channel Management. However, this was dissolved in 1998.

BBC Prime explained their decision to schedule older programmes in addition to newer ones: "For the majority of our viewers, who are European and African nationals, this is the first chance to see these programmes, and often the only way to view them."

Funding
Unlike the BBC's domestic channels, and some of their foreign channels paid for by the UK Foreign Office, BBC Prime was funded by subscription available either as part of a satellite package or as a stand-alone channel. It was also funded by adverts placed on the channel in breaks, and because of this, it was not available in the UK. Much of BBC Prime's programming was available to watch through BBC One, Two or the UKTV network, part owned by the BBC and showing archive programming.

Presentation 
BBC Prime's first ident consisted of five different diamonds shining, at first by each other, and then all of them, in a black background, with the BBC Prime logo placed in the bottom right corner. The logo at the time had the BBC logo, with "Prime" written in all capitals below in the Trajan Bold font. The ident had another version which had a jazz-styled music.

After the BBC went on its major rebrand, on 4 October 1997, BBC Prime rebranded for the first time. The logo now had the BBC blocks, with "Prime" in all capitals in the Gill Sans font next to it. The idents were designed by Martin Lambie-Nairn (along with the whole 1997 BBC branding) and start with epileptic water scenes with full of colours, before settling on the main part of the ident, which features the water in a blue to orange gradient with ripples and two marbles, reflected and inverted by each other. The logo is placed at the bottom.

On 4 December 2000, BBC Prime rebranded for the second time, also created by Lambie-Nairn. The idents were known as "Festival" and featured cartoon draws of famous UK sights, like the Big Ben, the Tower Bridge or the Stonehenge, shooting fireworks, followed by the looped, 15-second long sequence with exploding firework animations. The idents had a xylophone-and-trumpet music, with firework sounds playing in the background. Like the 1997 idents, the logo is placed at the bottom.

BBC Prime's final rebrand took place on 23 July 2006 with BBC Learning's discontinuation. The logo featured the 1997 logo being placed inside a turquoise circle (although the 1997 logo remained in use as the DOG). The idents consisted of differently coloured circles as people who do different situations, like going on a rollercoaster, jumping and swimming in the pool, or the grass being clipped with a lawnmower. These idents were used until BBC Prime was completely replaced by BBC Entertainment on 11 November 2009.

Availability

The channel was available in many areas through satellite and cable television
In the Netherlands and Belgium, the channel was available on cable, alongside BBC One, BBC Two and BBC World News.
It was available on digital terrestrial television (DTT) in the Netherlands and Malta.
In Gibraltar, GBC relayed BBC Prime  on its VHF and UHF channels with opt-outs.
In Turkey, it was available on Türksat Cable TV and Digiturk.
In Italy, it was available on SKY Italia.
In MENA, it was available on the Orbit Network Bahrain.
The South Africa service was launched in 1999 and contained some different programmes to that broadcast in Europe, due to some programmes already being licensed to other channels.
The Asia service was launched on 1 December 2004 and had a different schedule to that of the Europe service to reflect the different time zones, and cultural practices. It was available in Hong Kong (on Now TV's Channel 529), Thailand (on TrueVisions' (Channel 35), Singapore (on StarHub TV's Channel 76) and South Korea (on Skylife's Channel 334).

In order to cater to a wider audience, who do not have English as their first language, BBC Prime carried subtitles in Swedish, Danish, Norwegian, Czech, Polish, Romanian, Hungarian, Italian, Hebrew and Serbian. The Asian service also had subtitles in Chinese, Thai, and Korean.

A similar channel, called BBC Japan, launched in Japan on 1 December 2004, but ceased broadcasting on 30 April 2006 owing to problems with its local distributor.

Replacement

In September 2006 it was announced that the BBC Prime brand was to be phased out and replaced by BBC Entertainment, one of a number of new international channels planned by BBC Worldwide.

The process began with the Asian services, which switched on 6 October 2006, followed by the South African service on 1 September 2008. BBC Prime was completely replaced by BBC Entertainment on 11 November 2009.

Notes

External links
 BBC Prime Ident Compilation
 BBC Prime at TV Ark

International BBC television channels
Television channels and stations established in 1995
Television channels and stations disestablished in 2009
Defunct television channels in the Netherlands

hu:BBC Prime